Air Chief Marshal Sir Stephen Gary George Dalton,  (born 23 April 1954) is a retired senior officer of the Royal Air Force and former Lieutenant-Governor of Jersey.

As commanding officer of XIII Squadron, Dalton deployed on Operation Jural, the United Kingdom's contribution to Operation Southern Watch enforcing the No-Fly Zone over Southern Iraq. He then moved on to high command, serving as Head of Air Operations at the Ministry of Defence during the preparations for and conduct of Operation Telic in Iraq. Most recently he was appointed Chief of the Air Staff, the professional head of the Royal Air Force, in which role he advised the British Government on the deployment of air power during the Libyan conflict. In that capacity he implemented 2,700 redundancies, as determined by the Strategic Defence and Security Review.

Early life and education

Dalton was born on 23 April 1954. He was educated at Clarendon Park Junior School and Lancaster School in Leicester, and then the University of Bath, where he studied Aeronautical Engineering.

Military career

Dalton was commissioned as a University Cadet on 16 September 1973, before being regraded as a pilot officer following graduation on 15 July 1976. Dalton was promoted to flying officer on 15 January 1977, and then flight lieutenant on 15 October 1977. He flew the SEPECAT Jaguar on three tours, operating from the UK and Germany in both ground attack and tactical reconnaissance roles. Dalton was promoted to squadron leader on 1 July 1984, and awarded a Queen's Commendation for Valuable Service in the Air in the 1987 New Year Honours.

Following the Advanced Staff Course, training to fly the Panavia Tornado, and promotion to wing commander on 1 July 1990, Dalton commanded XIII Squadron. He deployed on Operation Jural, the United Kingdom's contribution to Operation Southern Watch enforcing the No-Fly Zone over Southern Iraq.

Dalton was promoted to group captain on 1 July 1994, and in 1997 took command of RAF Coltishall and the RAF's Jaguar force. On promotion to air commodore on 1 January 2000, he was appointed Head of the Eurofighter Typhoon Programme Assurance Group at the Ministry of Defence. Following the Higher Command and Staff Course in 2002, Dalton was appointed Head of Air Operations, also at the Ministry of Defence. His tenure in this role was dominated by the preparations for and conduct of Operation Telic in Iraq.

On promotion to air vice marshal on 14 May 2003, Dalton was appointed Director Information Superiority. He was also appointed Controller Aircraft in 2004, retaining this post upon his appointment as Director Typhoon on 2 May 2006. He was appointed a Companion of the Order of the Bath in the 2006 New Year Honours.

On 1 May 2007, Dalton was promoted to air marshal, and appointed Deputy Commander-in-Chief Personnel at Air Command and Air Member for Personnel. In the 2009 Birthday Honours he was appointed Knight Commander of the Order of the Bath. He was promoted to air chief marshal and appointed Chief of the Air Staff, and Air Aide-de-Camp to Queen Elizabeth II, on 31 July 2009. Dalton was appointed Knight Grand Cross of the Order of the Bath in the 2012 Birthday Honours.

In light of the Libyan conflict, Dalton warned that there "was a heck of a lot to be doing" and that the military was nearing the point of "exhaustion". On 24 June 2011 The Daily Telegraph confirmed that Dalton, in common with the First Sea Lord and the Chief of the General Staff, would lose his position on the Defence Board, the highest non-ministerial Ministry of Defence committee, which makes decisions on all aspect of military policy. He retired in July 2013.

Dalton was appointed as Honorary Air Commodore to the RAF Regiment on 21 September 2013, in succession to Air Chief Marshal Sir Richard Johns. He became Vice President of the Yorkshire Air Museum in 2009 before taking up the post of President in 2015.

Lieutenant Governor of Jersey

It was announced on 20 December 2016 that Dalton would be appointed Lieutenant Governor of Jersey. He was sworn into office on 13 March 2017.

He completed his term of office on 30 June 2022.

He was replaced by Vice Admiral Jerry Kyd, who took office in October 2022.

Personal life

Dalton is married to Anne: the couple has two grown-up children.

Dalton's interests include sports, theatre and history. He was awarded an honorary degree by the University of Leicester in 2011 and an honorary Doctorate of Science by the University of Bath in 2013.

References

External links

BBC News – Profile: Air Marshal Stephen Dalton

|-

|-

1954 births
Alumni of the University of Bath
Chiefs of the Air Staff (United Kingdom)
Fellows of the Royal Aeronautical Society
Graduates of the Royal Air Force College Cranwell
Honorary air commodores
Knights Grand Cross of the Order of the Bath
Living people
Recipients of the Commendation for Valuable Service in the Air
Royal Air Force air marshals
20th-century Royal Air Force personnel
21st-century Royal Air Force personnel
 
Military personnel from Leicester